Margit Appelt (born 14 January 1975) is an Austrian equestrian. She competed in two events at the 2004 Summer Olympics.

References

External links
 

1975 births
Living people
Austrian female equestrians
Olympic equestrians of Austria
Equestrians at the 2004 Summer Olympics
Sportspeople from Vienna